Tamara Monserrat  (born December 29, 1983) is a Mexican actress of film and television, primarily known for starring in several telenovelas.

Biography

Early life

Born in Palma de Mallorca, Spain, Monserrat is the daughter of Mallorcan businessman Jaime Monserrat.

Career

Monserrat began her acting career in the Centro de Formación Actoral de la Televisión Azteca in Mexico and has taken several acting courses at the School of Acting of the prestigious actress Patricia Reyes Spíndola.

She debuted as an actress in 2002 in the telenovela Por tí. In 2005 she got her first leading role in Telemundo's telenovela Los Plateados starring together with Mauricio Islas, Dominika Paleta and Humberto Zurita.

Filmography

References

External links

Mexican telenovela actresses
Mexican television actresses
1983 births
Living people